Shared Awareness and De-confliction (SHADE) is an international operational counter piracy platform, convened in Bahrain aimed to encourage partners for sharing information, assessing the evolution of trends, best practices and to de-conflict operations amongst counter-piracy actors in the Gulf of Aden, the Gulf of Oman and the Western Indian Ocean.

The first meeting, entitled ‘Shared Awareness and Deconfliction’ was held in Bahrain in December 2008 and is attended by a variety of nations and organizations involved in operations to counter piracy, such as the Combined Maritime Forces (CMF) and EU NAVFOR Somalia, which are operating in the Area.

Since 2017 SHADE meets twice a year in Bahrain, chaired alternatively by CMF and EU NAVFOR Somalia. The international shipping industry is a key stakeholder in SHADE meetings.  International organizations active in the maritime domain in the region such as WFP and UNODC also attend the SHADE meetings.

In 2017 a similar platform, SHADE MED, was established in relation to maritime security operations working to prevent illegal immigration in the Mediterranean sea.

On the 3rd and 4 November 2020, CMF and EU NAVFOR Somalia co-hosted the 47th Shared Awareness and De-confliction (SHADE) Conference. It was the first occasion in 11 years, that this event was convened virtually, as a result of the restrictions imposed by the COVID-19 pandemic.

References

Military units and formations established in 2008